Santiago Martínez (born 19 April 1983) is a Spanish weightlifter. He competed in the men's middle heavyweight event at the 2004 Summer Olympics.

References

1983 births
Living people
Spanish male weightlifters
Olympic weightlifters of Spain
Weightlifters at the 2004 Summer Olympics
Sportspeople from Girona
21st-century Spanish people